Kanye West announced his 2020 United States presidential election campaign  through Twitter on July 4, 2020. On July 16, 2020, the campaign filed a Statement of Candidacy with the Federal Election Commission. He entered the election after missing at least six states' deadlines to appear on the ballot as a third-party candidate. West selected Michelle Tidball, a Christian preacher from Wyoming, as his running mate.

West's platform advocated for the creation of a culture of life, endorsing environmental stewardship, supporting the arts, buttressing faith-based organizations, restoring school prayer, and providing for a strong national defense. A supporter of a consistent life ethic (a tenet of Christian democracy), West opposed abortion and capital punishment.

West qualified for ballot access in 12 states. The campaign sued for ballot access in five additional states (Arizona, Ohio, Wisconsin, Virginia and West Virginia), and subsequently lost all appeals,  gave up on four other states (Illinois, Montana, Missouri, and New Jersey), and missed the deadlines of a further 29 states, plus the District of Columbia. West additionally appeared on the California ballot, as Rocky De La Fuente's running mate, under the American Independent Party, something to which neither West nor De La Fuente had consented. Despite appearing on the California ballot as a running mate, West urged his followers on Twitter to vote for him as a write-in instead.

West conceded his campaign on November 4, 2020, the morning after Election Day, after receiving roughly 70,000 votes in the 12 states where he had ballot access. West ultimately ranked 4th (5th in Colorado, Minnesota and Vermont) in vote count in his states, and received the 7th highest national vote count for a Presidential candidate. West expressed interest in running again in 2024 on the same day.

Background 
In July 2020, West stated that the idea for his campaign occurred when he was offered the Michael Jackson Video Vanguard Award at the 2015 MTV Video Music Awards (VMA). While showering in his then mother-in-law Kris Jenner's home, West was writing a rap song and thought of the lyric "you're going to run for president". He started laughing hysterically at the thought of including a presidential announcement in his acceptance speech, along with disparaging remarks about award shows. On August 30, 2015, West announced at the VMA that he would be running for president in 2020. The following month, on September 24, West reaffirmed to Vanity Fair that he was considering a 2020 presidential run.

In December 2015, he mentioned his presidential run on his song "Facts". In November 2016, West announced that he supported U.S. president Donald Trump. On December 13, 2016, West met with then President-elect Trump and Ivanka Trump. After meeting with Trump, West implied that he would be running in 2024 instead. When Trump was still running for the Republican nomination, he was asked about running against Kanye and responded, "You know what? I will never say bad about him, you know why? Because he loves Trump!" Though he added, "Now, maybe in a few years I will have to run against him, I don’t know. So I’ll take that back".

In April 2018, West became popular with conservatives and the alt-right after he publicly supported American conservative pundit Candace Owens. In May 2018, West stated that his presidential run would be a mix between "the Trump campaign and maybe the Bernie Sanders principles". 

In October 2018, West met with Trump at the Oval Office where he gave praise to the president. That same month, West announced he would be taking a break from politics after a falling out with Owens. The following month, West's wife Kim Kardashian stated that he supported Trump's personality but had no understanding of his policies.

In an October 2019 interview with New Zealand radio host Zane Lowe, West declared that he would one day be the U.S. president. In November 2019, an audience laughed when West stated that he would run for president in 2024. He stated that manufacturing for his Yeezy brand would move to the United States, adding that "we would've created so many jobs that I'm not going to run [for president in 2024], I'm going to walk." In January 2020, West told GQ that he would be voting during the election cycle and that "we know who I'm voting on."

Campaign

Announcement
West announced his campaign on Independence Day via Twitter, writing "We must now realize the promise of America by trusting God, unifying our vision and building our future. I am running for president of the United States! 🇺🇸 #2020VISION". West's campaign announcement went viral, receiving over 100,000 retweets and "Kanye" became the number one trending term in the United States. Various sources questioned whether West was truly running for president or not, as his announcement came after the filing deadlines to run for a major party in all 50 states and most primary elections. He also missed at least four states' deadlines to appear on the ballot as an independent candidate. However, there is no official deadline to have a candidate registered with the Federal Election Commission (FEC). On July 7, West argued that he could gain access to appear on ballots beyond their deadline, using complications caused by the COVID-19 pandemic as precedent.

On July 5, West tweeted a photograph of dome-like personal shelters with the caption "YZY SHLTRS in process". The structures are similar to the prefabricated subsidized housing prototypes West built in August 2019 (inspired by settlements on Tatooine from Star Wars) in Calabasas, California, which had to be torn down as a result of lacking proper permits with the Los Angeles County Department of Public Works. The shelters are designed to be used as housing units for homeless people. On July 7, Entertainment Tonight reported that West was allegedly "telling people close to him that his announcement of running for president is serious". That same day, Trump told RealClearPolitics that he was watching the campaign intently, saying it could serve as a trial run for West if he were to run again in 2024. The FEC began investigating fictitious filings under West's name.

Forbes piece and signature collecting
West's candidacy was covered by Forbes on July 8. West stated that he would make the final decision to run within 30 days and denied that his campaign was promotion for his then forthcoming tenth studio album Donda. He revealed his two campaign advisors were his wife Kim Kardashian and SpaceX and Tesla, Inc. CEO, Elon Musk. West also stated that he proposed to Musk that he would "be the head of our space program". West registered to vote for the first time within the previous week and selected Michelle Tidball, a relatively unknown Christian preacher from Wyoming, as his running mate. West stated that he would run under the Birthday Party, because "when we win, it's everybody's birthday", and that he was running for president as a service to God.

Musk reacted to the Forbes piece by tweeting, "We may have more differences of opinion than I anticipated". He later deleted his tweet. Musk reiterated his support for the presidential campaign on July 13 after having a conversation with West where he further explained his views. However, Musk stated his opinion that West running in 2024 would be more preferable than 2020. On July 9, Trump downplayed West's recent criticism of him, stating that West and Kardashian were "always going to be for us". Trump speculated that West would likely support him because the "radical left" needed to be stopped. The same day, West tweeted a video of himself registering to vote for the first time at the Park County Clerk's Office in Cody, Wyoming. In the video, West discussed with an office employee about changing the difficulties of voter registration in the United States.

On July 14, Ben Jacobs of Intelligencer reported that a source stated on July 8 that they were paid $5,000 to collect signatures on West's behalf in Florida. They needed to collect 132,781 valid signatures before a July 15 deadline for West to qualify on the ballot as a third-party candidate. The following day, voter turnout specialist Steve Kramer told Jacobs that he had been hired to get West on the ballot in South Carolina and Florida. Kramer stated that at the time, West's team was "working over weekend there, formalizing the FEC and other things that they've got to do when you have a lot of corporate lawyers involved." Kramer followed-up with Jacobs and stated that he had to fire his 180-person staff, made up of paid personnel and volunteers, because West was "out".

FEC paperwork and South Carolina rally

On July 15, a Statement of Organization (Form 1) was filed with the FEC. The filing declared a "Kanye 2020" campaign committee with West running as a presidential candidate under the Birthday Party. The filing listed a property bought by West in October 2019 as its address, along with an inactive website and phone number. West notarized an Oklahoma statement of candidacy while in Miami and had a representative pay a $35,000 filing fee on the day of the state's deadline. The Oklahoma State Election Board later announced that West qualified to appear on the general election ballot as an independent candidate. The following day, West filed a Statement of Candidacy (Form 2) with the FEC, indicating that $5,000 has been raised or spent in campaign-related expenses. Form 2 grants West candidacy status under federal campaign laws.

On July 17, West tweeted out a form for collecting digital signatures from South Carolinians so that he could qualify as an independent candidate in the state; the deadline to collect 10,000 signatures was July 20. The campaign set up nine locations near Charleston, South Carolina, to collect signatures in-person, with West sharing the list of locations through Twitter. The petition locations ran from July 18 to 19. West held his first campaign event at Exquis Event Center in North Charleston, South Carolina, on July 19. West wore a bulletproof vest, spoke without a microphone, and called on audience members to speak. During the speech, West criticized American abolitionist Harriet Tubman and claimed that Tubman did not free the slaves, but instead had the slaves go work for other white people, cried during a conversation about abortion as an unborn baby, and briefly mentioned that he and his wife were almost going to abort his eldest daughter, North. He also discussed his opposition to gun control, his support for the LGBT community, and finding a way to fix drug addiction caused by health care.

In an interview with Kris Kaylin of Charleston radio station WWWZ, West outlined the ten principles of his campaign and stated that he asked fellow rapper Jay-Z if he wanted to replace Tidball as his running mate. The South Carolina Election Commission confirmed on July 20 that West failed to submit his petition on time. On July 22, West tweeted that he may postpone his presidential run to 2024, though he subsequently deleted it.

Petition submissions and withdrawals

On July 20, the campaign filed West as an independent candidate in Illinois, where West's childhood home city of Chicago is located, four minutes before the submission deadline.  Three objections were filed, all from the Chicago area, and one of which had five individual objectors.  August 21 was set as the deadline to verify if the campaign has submitted the minimum 2,500 valid signatures that are required for ballot access.
On August 7, 2020, Illinois election officials released a statement saying Kanye West only had 1,200 valid signatures, 1,300 short of qualifying for ballot access.

On July 27, the campaign submitted its petition signatures in Missouri just before the deadline. West also filed as a candidate in New Jersey. Former Democratic congressional candidate in 2018 and attorney, Scott Salmon, challenged West's signature submissions in New Jersey on July 29. Salmon alleged several signatures were written by the same person, stating, "[t]he odds that 30 people in a row from all over the state would have a little circle about the Is is a little hard to believe". The campaign withdrew its New Jersey petition on August 4.

On July 29, TMZ reported that the campaign was canvassing in New York and West Virginia. On August 3, Intelligencer reported the campaign had begun to expand signature-collecting operations into the swing states of Wisconsin and Ohio, along with Arkansas. Multiple challenges were made to West's petition to appear on the Wisconsin ballot. One such challenge suggested numerous problems with West's nomination papers, including incorrect addresses and fake or fraudulent signatures, such as "Mickey Mouse" and "Bernie Sanders." It also included affidavits from six individuals who said they were duped into putting their names on West's paperwork. A lawyer for the campaign responded to the missed deadline allegation by blaming iPhone clocks for being "notoriously faulty". West accused the Democratic Party of hiring a private investigator to follow his signature collectors as part of an "organized effort of harassment and intimidation".

On August 7, 2020 it became mathematically impossible for the campaign to get the required number of electoral votes for West to win the presidency.

On August 20, 2020 election officials in Wisconsin and Montana decided that West was not eligible to appear on their state ballots. A day later, officials in Ohio, Illinois and West Virginia ruled that he did not qualify either for their respective ballots. On the contrary, West has qualified to appear on the ballot in at least Arkansas, Colorado, Oklahoma, Utah and Vermont, according to spokespersons for the election offices in those states. A spokesman for the Iowa secretary of state's office said West's nominating petitions have been accepted in that state but are still subject to objections.

Republican Party contacts

Veteran Republican operatives have been helping him organize and petition. Gregg Keller, the former executive director of the American Conservative Union and worker for Mitt Romney and Josh Hawley, was listed as West's point of contact when he filed in Arkansas. Lane Ruhland, who had served as legal counsel for the Republican Party of Wisconsin, was filmed dropping off the signatures to qualify West for the state ballot to the state elections commission. In Virginia, West's campaign gives the address of the law firm Holtzman Vogel Josefiak Torchinsky, whose managing partner is state senator Jill Holtzman Vogel. In Wisconsin, West's legal advocate had been secretary-treasurer of the Minnesota Republican party.

In Vermont, West submitted three presidential electors which included Chuck Wilton, a Vermont delegate to the 2020 Republican National Convention. Wilton was later replaced by Bradford Broyles, the former chairman of the Rutland County Republican Party, as a presidential elector for West. In Colorado, four of the nine presidential electors for West were Republican operatives. In Tennessee, West submitted twelve presidential electors which included Rick Williams, a Tennessee delegate to the 2016 Republican National Convention who had supported Trump and served as director of Middle Tennessee for Trump.

West met with Trump's senior advisor Jared Kushner in Colorado to have a discussion on "black empowerment," while ostensibly running against Donald Trump.

According to Reuters, on January 4, 2021, a Kanye West-linked publicist pressured a Georgia election worker to confess to false charges of election tampering to assist Trump's claims of election interference. 

In December 2021, The Daily Beast reported that West's 2020 presidential campaign received millions of dollars in services from a secret network of Republican operatives, some of these payments the committee did not report, and used an unusual abbreviation for the others to allegedly conceal the association with the GOP according to campaign finance experts.

Marketing
On August 18, West tweeted a promotional poster for his campaign. It features pictures of diverse people, in between the phrase "Kanye 2020 Vision". An image of Kirsten Dunst is featured prominently, prompting the actress to reply, "What's the message here, and why am I apart of it?"

West debuted his first official campaign video on October 12, in which he emphasized religious freedom and family values as core issues to his candidacy.

2024 presidential campaign

On the 4th of November 2020 West posted a tweet with the caption "KANYE 2024". In a letter sent by his Kanye 2020 election committee to the Federal Elections Commission, West stated that he "has not decided" on a run in 2024. West announced on November 20, 2022 that he would be running in 2024. Early focus on his campaign was centered around his positions surrounding Jewish conspiracies and Nazism, declaring that he "loves" Adolf Hitler and denies the Holocaust.

Campaign finance

West raised $14,538,989.74 on his presidential campaign, loaning $12,473,002.99 of his own money to his campaign and raising $2,064,715.66 from individual contributions. He spent $13,210,013.02 and has $250,000.00 in outstanding debts with $1,328,976.72 of ending cash in hand.

In April 2021, a document obtained by Citizens for Responsibility and Ethics in Washington showed that the Office of Government Ethics was refusing to certify West's financial returns. According to CREW's communications director Jordan Libowitz, this was likely because West declined to fully disclose his wife Kim Kardashian's income and assets by using a rare exemption when the candidate has no knowledge of such income and assets. Libowitz also pointed out West's failure to disclose information about three trusts he was a trustee for, and that any penalties were unlikely to be substantial.

In December 2021, The Daily Beast reported that Kanye's presidential campaign received millions of dollars in services from a secret network of Republican Party operatives, including Republican elite advisors and a managing partner at one of the largest conservative political firms in the United States. The Kanye campaign committee also did not report having paid some of these advisors and used an abbreviation for another advisor, constituting a potential violation of federal laws. According to campaign finance experts, these actions were done in an attempt to hide any connections between Kanye's presidential campaign and Republican operatives.

Analysis 
On July 4, Jack Dolan of the Los Angeles Times speculated that West's presidential campaign "might be part of an effort to draw Black supporters away from Joe Biden to help Trump." However, Andrew Solender of Forbes wrote that available polling data suggested that, if anything, West's run would likely hurt Trump rather than Biden.

On July 7, West stated that he was okay with splitting off black voters from the Democratic Party. Trump stated on July 11 that it "shouldn't be hard" for West to siphon black voters from Biden. In his South Carolina rally, West stated that "the most racist thing that's ever been said out loud" was the idea that he would split black voters. On August 6, when asked if he intended to damage Biden's campaign, he stated, "I'm not denying it."

Several publications, including Politico, The Guardian, and Forbes, questioned whether West's campaign was a legitimate effort or a publicity stunt. West disputed allegations that his campaign was promotion for his music in July 2020.

Multiple Republican operatives assisted West in his attempts to make the presidential ballots of multiple states, including convention delegates for incumbent U.S. president Donald Trump. Lane Ruhland, a Republican lawyer and former general counsel for the Wisconsin Republican Party, personally delivered West's nominating papers to state regulators past the state's statutory filing deadline. The connections raised questions about the aims of the entertainer's campaign, and whether it was genuine in its sincerity or intended to act as a spoiler and aid Trump's reelection bid. Trump denied any personal involvement with aiding the campaign, stating, "I like Kanye very much, but no, I have nothing to do with him getting on the ballot. We’ll have to see what happens." John Avlon of CNN compared the campaign's association with several Republicans to that of alleged Republican efforts to bolster the 2004 presidential campaign of Ralph Nader.

On October 20, former child actor and independent presidential candidate Brock Pierce invited West to a third-party presidential debate in Wyoming. West did not respond publicly to the invite.

Endorsements 

The following individuals endorsed West:
2 Chainz, rapper (later switched endorsement to Joe Biden)
Pamela Anderson, actress, model, and television personality
Carole Baskin, animal rights activist
Dez Bryant, professional football player
Nick Cannon, comedian, rapper, and television host
Chance the Rapper, rapper and songwriter
DaBaby, rapper and songwriter
Khloé Kardashian, media personality and West's ex-sister-in-law
Kim Kardashian, media personality and West's ex-wife
Kourtney Kardashian, media personality and West's sister-in-law
Rose McGowan, actress, activist, author, director, and singer
Elon Musk, CEO of SpaceX and Tesla, Inc. (also endorsed Andrew Yang)
Darrelle Revis, retired professional football player
Dennis Rodman, American basketball player
Ty Dolla Sign, singer, songwriter, and record producer
Rochelle Stevens, 1996 Olympic gold medalist for the United States in the women's 4x400-meter relay

Ballot access

Qualified for presidential ballot access (12 states, 84 electoral votes): Arkansas, Colorado, Idaho, Iowa, Kentucky, Louisiana, Minnesota, Mississippi, Oklahoma, Tennessee, Utah, and Vermont.
Presidential ballot access requirements submitted but withdrawn, dismissed, or denied (nine states, 104 electoral votes): Arizona, Illinois, Missouri, Montana, New Jersey, Wisconsin, Ohio, Virginia, and West Virginia.
Presidential ballot access deadline missed (29 states + the District of Columbia, 350 electoral votes): Alabama, Alaska, California, Connecticut, Delaware, the District of Columbia, Florida, Georgia, Hawaii, Indiana, Kansas, Maine, Maryland, Massachusetts, Michigan, Nebraska, Nevada, New Hampshire, New Mexico, New York, North Carolina, North Dakota, Oregon, Pennsylvania, Rhode Island, South Carolina, South Dakota, Texas, Washington, and Wyoming.

Litigation
West submitted signatures to obtain ballot access in Ohio, Wisconsin and West Virginia. In all three states the Secretary of State determined there were not enough valid signatures and denied West ballot access. Following these decisions, West filed lawsuits in all three states to overturn these decisions.

On August 5, 2020, West submitted his presidential petition in Ohio with 14,886 signatures, more than the 5,000 required. However, the Secretary of State of Ohio rejected his petition stating that the original declaration of candidacy did not match the copies used on each petition sheet. On August 26, West filed a lawsuit against the Secretary of State to the Supreme Court of Ohio to get onto the ballot, but the Ohio Supreme Court ruled 7–0 on September 10, that West would not appear on the ballot.

When West submitted his presidential petitions in Wisconsin multiple witnesses alleged that he was eighteen seconds past the 5:00 p.m. deadline. A challenge to West's petitions was filed. On August 19, the staff of the Wisconsin Elections Commission recommended that West be removed from the ballot, and on August 20, the commission voted to removed West from the ballot. West filed a lawsuit after being removed from the ballot. On September 10, the Wisconsin Supreme Court ordered election officials to stop mailing out ballots until the court ruled on whether or not Howie Hawkins and/or West could appear on the ballot. On September 11, Brown County Circuit Judge John Zakowski ruled that the election commission was correct to remove West from the ballot.

On September 14, 2020, a U.S. District Judge in West Virginia struck down West's challenge to appear on the West Virginia ballot.

Lawsuits were filed to keep West off the ballot in Virginia, Arizona, and Idaho. On September 3, 2020, a Richmond, Virginia, judge ordered that Kanye West's name not appear on the Virginia ballot, and a Maricopa County, Arizona, judge ordered that Kanye West's name not appear on the Arizona ballot. West appealed the decision, but the decision became final after it was confirmed by Arizona Supreme Court on September 8. West also appealed the Virginia decision to the Virginia Supreme Court. On September 17, 2020, the Virginia Supreme Court rejected West's appeal to appear on the ballot.

An attempt was made to remove West from the Idaho presidential ballot on the grounds that West could not run as an independent candidate while registered as a Republican. However, Lawerence Denney, the Secretary of State of Idaho, stated that West would remain on the ballot. The Idaho Democratic Party filed a lawsuit to remove West from the ballot on the basis that he cannot run as an independent because he is registered as a Republican.

Political positions 
West's platform advocated for the creation of a culture of life, endorsing environmental stewardship, supporting the arts, buttressing faith-based organizations, restoring school prayer, providing for a strong national defense, and "America First" diplomacy. His 10-point policy agenda was listed under the headline "Creating a Culture of Life," and featured a Bible verse for each item. Being in support of a consistent life ethic, a tenet of Christian democracy political ideology, West opposes abortion and capital punishment. West stated in July 2020 that he would run for president under the banner of the newly formed Birthday Party, but had Trump not been running, he would have affiliated himself with the Republican Party.

Abortion and birth control 
In October 2019, West spoke out against abortion, stating "thou shalt not kill". He also alleged that the Democratic Party was pushing black people to use levonorgestrel, commonly known as Plan B, as a form of voter suppression. West's comments were praised by anti-abortion organizations Live Action and Students for Life, and the conservative news website The Daily Wire. In July 2020, West stated "I am pro-life because I'm following the word of the Bible" and expressed his belief that "Planned Parenthoods have been placed inside cities by white supremacists to do the Devil's work." Nia Martin-Robinson of Planned Parenthood criticized West's statements, asserting that "[a]ny insinuation that abortion is Black genocide is offensive and infantilizing".

At a July rally in South Carolina, West stated abortion should be legal because "the law is not by God anyway". However, he proposed giving every mother that does not abort their child a financial incentive, using "$1 million or something in that range" as an example. He did not disclose how he would pay for such incentives.

Black Lives Matter and police brutality 
In November 2016, West told black people to "stop focusing on racism", but clarified that his support for Trump did not mean he did not "believe in Black Lives Matter." In June 2020, West participated in the George Floyd protests and donated $2million to help victims of the rioting that took place during demonstrations. He also paid off Floyd's daughter's college tuition. The following month, West stated that one of his priorities would be to end police brutality, adding that "[the] police are people too".

Prison reform
In September 2018, West called for the alteration of the Thirteenth Amendment because of a loophole that suggests it is legal to enslave convicts. During a meeting with Trump the following month, West called the Thirteenth Amendment a "trap door". In October 2019, West stated during a performance with the Sunday Service Choir that people were too busy discussing music and sports instead of focusing on a broken system that he claims imprisons "one in three African-Americans...in this country." The following month, West alleged that the media calls him "crazy" to silence his opinion, connecting this to the incarceration of African-Americans and celebrities. On his album Jesus Is King (2019), West discussed the Thirteenth Amendment, mass incarceration, criticized the prison–industrial complex, and connected three-strikes laws to slavery.

Welfare 
In May 2018, West espoused the "Democratic plantation" theory that welfare is a tool used by the Democratic Party to keep black Americans as an underclass that remains reliant on the party. During a September 2018 special guest appearance on Saturday Night Live, after the show had already gone off the air, West alleged to the crowd that it was a Democratic Party plan "to take the fathers out [of] the home and promote welfare."

The following month, West alleged that homicide was a byproduct of a "welfare state" that destroyed black families. Jelani Cobb challenged West's claim in The New Yorker (at least as much as it applied to Chicago), arguing that "the catalysts for violence in that city predate the 'welfare state' and the rise of single-parent black households, in the nineteen-seventies." He pointed to findings from Chicago Commission on Race Relations regarding the violence of the Chicago race riots of 1919 and a 1945 study entitled Black Metropolis, published by sociologists St. Clair Drake and Horace Cayton, which Cobb wrote, "detailed the ways in which discrimination in housing and employment were negatively affecting black migrants." He also noted similar observations made by W. E. B. Du Bois in Philadelphia, in 1903.

Polling 
West was only included as an option on a small proportion of polls (see nationwide and state-level polling).

National polls

Hypothetical polls

Statewide polls

Arizona

Florida

Iowa

Michigan

Minnesota

North Carolina

Oklahoma

Pennsylvania

Wisconsin

Favorability

Results

Kanye West received 66,641 votes in the 12 states he had ballot access in, receiving an average of 0.32%. Kanye West received the most votes in the state of Tennessee, where he won 10,256 votes, however percentage-wise, West's best state was in Utah, where he received 0.48%.

In addition, the Roque De La Fuente / Kanye West ticket won 60,160 votes in California (0.34%; 5th out of 6). The winner was Joe Biden (D).

Kanye West's voters base varied among education levels, age, race, gender, and partisanship. However his voters were more likely to be religious on average.

See also 
Christian democracy
Third party and independent candidates for the 2020 United States presidential election

Notes

References 

2020 United States presidential campaigns
Kanye West
Opposition to the death penalty